YJC may refer to:

Youth Justice Coalition
Young Journalists Club